Wildfire is a fire in an area of combustible vegetation that occurs in the countryside or rural areas.

Wildfire or Wild Fire may also refer to:

People
 "Wildfire", Chippewa name of sculptor Edmonia Lewis (c. 1844–1907)

Arts, entertainment, and media

Fictional entities
Wildfire (Drake Burroughs), a DC Comics superhero and member of the Legion of Super-Heroes
 Wildfire (Carol Vance Martin), a Quality Comics female superhero from the 1940s
 Wildfire, a flammable substance similar to Greek fire, featured in George R. R. Martin's fantasy novel series, A Song of Ice and Fire, and its TV adaptation, Game of Thrones
 Wildfire, a spaceship capable of crossing universes in the British TV miniseries Red Dwarf
 Wildfire, a biological facility in The Andromeda Strain
 Wildfire, a playable "Trap Master" character in Skylanders: Trap Team

Films
 Wildfire (1915 film), a 1915 silent film
 Wildfire (1925 film), a 1925 silent film
 Wildfire (1945 film), an American film directed by Robert Emmett Tansey
 Wildfire (1988 film), an American film directed by Zalman King

Gaming
 WildFire (2016), a 3D MOBA video game developed by NetEase Inception Studios
 Jagged Alliance 2: Wildfire, a mod for the computer game Jagged Alliance 2
 Sonic Wild Fire, the former name for the Sonic and the Secret Rings video game for the Nintendo Wii
 WildFire For NX, a spiritual successor to the Disaster: Day Of Crisis video game for the Nintendo Wii
 Wildfire Games, a freeware hobbyist game developer studio
 Wildfire Pinball, a handheld pinball simulator manufactured by Parker Brothers in 1979

Literature
 Wild Fire (novel), a 2006 novel by Nelson DeMille
Wildfire, a play by George Broadhurst  New York 1908, filmed as Wildfire (1915 film)
Wildfire, a 1986 romance novel by Alexandra Scott, published by Harlequin
Wildfire, the Story of a Wild Horse novel by Zane Grey made into a film When Romance Rides (1922)
Wildfire, an imprint of the publisher Headline Publishing Group

Music

Groups
 Wild Fire (band), an American hard rock band
 Wildfire (British band), British heavy metal band of the 1980s

Albums
 Wild Fire (album), a 1971 album by jazz saxophonist Rusty Bryant
 Wild Fire, a 1985 album by John Holt
  Wildfire (Rachel Platten album), a 2016 album by singer-songwriter Rachel Platten
 Wildfire, the working title for Julianne Hough's unreleased second album.

Songs
 "Wildfire" (Crowder song), 2018
 "Wildfire" (Michael Martin Murphey song), 1975
 "Wildfire" (SBTRKT song), 2011
 "The Wildfire (If It Was True)", by Mando Diao, 2007
 "Wildfire", a song by Bad Wolves on the album Dear Monsters
 "Wildfire", a song by Ben Rector on the album The Walking in Between
 "Wildfire", a song by Blink-182 on the album California (Blink-182 album)
 "Wildfire", a song by Budgie from their EP If Swallowed, Do Not Induce Vomiting
 "Wildfire", a song by The Coral on their album The Coral
 "Wildfire", a song by Crossfaith featuring Benji Webbe of Skindred on the album Xeno
 "Wildfire", a song by Demi Lovato from her album Confident
 "Wildfire", a song by HammerFall on the album (r)Evolution
 "Wildfire", a song by John Mayer on his album Paradise Valley
 "Wildfire", a song by Marianas Trench from their album Astoria
 "Wildfire", a song by P.O.D. on the album Payable on Death
 "Wildfire", a song by Sara Evans on her album Stronger
 "Wildfires", a song by Sault on the album Untitled (Black Is)
 "Wildfire", a song by Sonata Arctica on the album Reckoning Night
 "Wildfire, Part: II - One With the Mountain" and "Part: III - Wildfire Town, Population: 0", sequels to the Sonata Arctica song in Stones Grow Her Name
 "Wildfire", a song by Tinashe from her album Aquarius
 "Wildfire", a song by Zac Brown Band on the album Jekyll + Hyde
 "Wildfire", a song by 311 on the album Mosaic

Television
 Wildfire (1986 TV series), an animated series produced by Hanna-Barbera in 1986
 Wildfire (2005 TV series), an American television drama series on ABC Family
 "Wildfire" (The Walking Dead), an episode of the television series The Walking Dead

Roller coasters
 Wildfire (Kolmården Wildlife Park), a roller coaster at Kolmården Wildlife Park in Bråviken, Sweden
 Wildfire (Silver Dollar City), a roller coaster in Silver Dollar City, Missouri

Technology
 Wildfire, an XMPP server, the old name of Openfire
 Wildfire, a graphics and animation software application for AmigaOS computers
 HTC Wildfire, an Android OS smartphone made by HTC Corporation
 HTC Wildfire S, an updated version of the HTC Wildfire smartphone
 Wildfire 5.0, one name for the CAD/CAM/CAE software called Pro/ENGINEER
 Wildfire Communications Inc, a voice communications startup that was sold to Orange
 Wildfire Interactive Inc, a social marketing application that was sold to Google

Transportation
 Wild Fire, a type of rocket vehicle designed by the da Vinci Project
 Wildfire (motor company), manufacturers of small-engine and electric vehicles
 Wildfire, a slave ship arrested off the Florida coast by the U.S. Navy in 1860
 Woodill Wildfire, an American sports car

Other uses
 Wildfire, a restaurant concept owned by Lettuce Entertain You Enterprises
 Miliaria profunda, the most severe form of the miliaria skin disease, sometimes referred to as "wildfire"
 Wildfire was the name given to an incendiary weapon similar to Greek fire used in the British civil wars.

See also
 Wyldfire, a dating app introduced in 2014